In the Cool of the Day is a 1963 British-American romantic drama film released by Metro-Goldwyn-Mayer in Metrocolor and Panavision. The film is directed by Robert Stevens and starring Peter Finch, Jane Fonda, Angela Lansbury, Arthur Hill, and Constance Cummings; with Nigel Davenport, and John Le Mesurier.

Plot
Christine Bonner (Fonda) is a beautiful young American woman with chronic health problems. She has been separated from her adoring but overly protective husband Sam (Hill), but agrees to return to him. She meets an English friend of Sam's, Murray Logan (Finch), who shares her great interest in Greece. Logan also is unhappily married because his wife, Sybil (Lansbury), blames him for an automobile accident that scarred her and killed their son. Christine and Murray meet again in England and their attraction grows.

The two couples plan to vacation together in Greece, but Sam must stay home because of a family illness. Murray and Christine fall in love as they visit Greek ruins and other tourist attractions.  Sybil realizes what is happening and writes Sam in New York.  She then tells Murray she is leaving him, running off to the Riviera for a fling with an Englishman (Davenport) she met in Greece. She tells Christine “he’s all yours.”

Hearing that Christine’s controlling mother is pursuing them, they continue their travels, eventually making love.  Christine’s mother finds them and takes her away. Christine falls ill from the stress and exertion and, according to Sam, refuses to fight for her life. Before dying, Christine tells Murray she did not want him to have to deal with her chronic illness. She makes Murray promise to do what they would have done together. He continues his travels in Greece.

Cast
 Peter Finch as Murray Logan
 Jane Fonda as Christine Bonner
 Angela Lansbury as Sybil Logan
 Arthur Hill as Sam Bonner
 Constance Cummings as Mrs. Nina Gellert
 Alexander Knox as Frederick Bonner
 Nigel Davenport as Leonard Groves
 John Le Mesurier as Dr. Arraman
 Alec McCowen as Dickie Bayliss
 Valerie Taylor as Lily Kendrick
 Andreas Markos as Andreas

Production
The novel was published in 1960. The New York Times called it "a mixture of high romance and exotic travelogue".

Film rights were bought by MGM who assigned John Houseman to produce. Houseman had just returned to the studio after a six year absence. Meade Roberts, who had written a TV adaptation of Wings of the Dove for Houseman, was working on the script by January 1961. In July Robert Stevens was announced as director; it was the second of a two picture deal with MGM, the first being I Thank a Fool. Stevens had worked with Houseman several times on television.

In February 1962 Houseman said the film was in planning stages and described the project as "essentially it is a romantic drama dealing with marital problems, the settings of which are New York, Connecticut, London and Greece. No cast as yet?"

Peter Finch, who had just made I Thank a Fool with Stevens, was the first cast member announced. In May 1962 MGM signed Jane Fonda, who had just made A Period of Adjustment with the studio, would star.

Filming took place in August 1962. It was made on locations in London, Greece and at MGM-British Studios, Borehamwood, Herts. The production schedule was hampered by the fact Jane Fonda was required back in New York at a certain date to begin rehearsals for a play. Houseman joked that the film was split into two sections, "Jane Fonda" and "post-Jane Fonda".

Reception
On the January 19, 2018 episode of Watch What Happens Live, Fonda stated it was the worst film she'd ever made and she wished it had never been filmed; so bad, in fact, she wasn't even certain if it had been released.

References

External links
 
 
 
 

Films directed by Robert Stevens
1963 films
1963 romantic drama films
Metro-Goldwyn-Mayer films
Films shot at MGM-British Studios
1960s English-language films
American romantic drama films
British romantic drama films
1960s American films
1960s British films
Films shot in Athens